Investigations into allegations of corruption against Indonesian former president/dictator Suharto began immediately after his 32-year rule. In Global Transparency Report, made by Transparency International in 2004, he was ranked as the world’s most corrupt leader. The report accused Suharto of causing losses of US$15–35 billion for the Indonesian government.

Suharto headed several organizations during his rule, with various functions, including to provide educational, health, and give support for veterans of Trikora. All of these organizations were suspected of receiving illicit funds, which was embezzled from the state.

History 
After the fall of Suharto, calls for his arrest, on the basis of corruption, emerged. People's Consultative Assembly decree no. XI/1998 declared that attempts to eradicate corruption must include investigations into Suharto.

Despite of ongoing investigations into alleged corruption, in 2006 attorney general Abdul Rachman Saleh declared the issuance of the "Termination of Criminal Persecution Decree" (Surat Keputusan Penghentian Penuntutan Pidana, SKP3). The decree suspended all attempts to prosecute Suharto because he was medically unfit to stand trial. This decision was overturned by a South Jakarta state court, on the grounds that physical and mental decline aren’t valid reasons to suspend prosecution. The revocation of the decree allowed investigations into Suharto to proceed.

Suharto's death on 27 January 2008 failed to stop the corruption case. Suharto’s children replaced him as the defendants of the case, shortly before his death.

Allegations and convictions

Supersemar
Established by Suharto in 1974, Supersemar provided scholarships for Indonesian students. Supersemar’s income was mainly from state-owned banks, with Decree no. 15/1976 allowing state-owned banks to deposit income into Supersemar.

In 2015, the Supersemar Foundation was convicted, after several failed attempts to suspend prosecution. This conviction forced the organization to pay Rp4.4 trillion in damages to the state.

The foundation had incomes of Rp185 billion embezzled, instead being delivered to Suharto and co-conspirators. US$420 million was distributed to Bank Duta, Rp13 billion to Sempati Air, and the rest went to other companies and cooperatives.

Dana Sejahtera Mandiri
In 1995, Suharto issued presidential decree no. 90 which recommended for all taxpayers with incomes above Rp100 million to donate 2% of their income to the Dana Sejahtera Mandiri. This decree was revised by decree no. 92/1996, which made the donation compulsory. The decree caused losses of Rp1.4 trillion for taxpayers, which was distributed among Suharto’s family. Rp112 billion was distributed to the son of Suharto’s bank.

Trikora 
Suharto established a foundation to support the families of Trikora veterans. In 2000, the Indonesian attorney general accused the organization of stealing Rp7 billion, which was redirected for other operations.

See also
 Corruption in Indonesia
 1Malaysia Development Berhad scandal (Malaysia)

References 

Suharto
Corruption in Indonesia
The 10 most corrupt politicians in the world ultimate 2020 list